The following lists events that happened during 1887 in South Africa.

Incumbents
 Governor of the Cape of Good Hope and High Commissioner for Southern Africa: Hercules Robinson.
 Governor of the Colony of Natal: Henry Ernest Gascoyne Bulwer.
 State President of the Orange Free State: Jan Brand.
 State President of the South African Republic: Paul Kruger.
 Prime Minister of the Cape of Good Hope: John Gordon Sprigg.

Events
June
 21 – The Nederlandsche-Zuid-Afrikaansche Spoorweg-Maatschappij (NZASM) is floated.
 21 – Zululand becomes a British colony.

Unknown date
 The town of Boksburg is laid out to serve the surrounding gold mines.
 The Stellenbosch Gymnasium, later to become the Stellenbosch University, changes its name to Victoria College, after Queen Victoria.

Births

Deaths
 29 May – Xhosa chief Sandile is killed in Denge Forest in a skirmish with the Fingos under the command of Captain J. Lonsdale.

Railways

New lines

 Construction begins on the Delagoa Bay-Pretoria line.

Railway lines opened
 October – Cape Central – Worcester to Roodewal, .

Locomotives
 The Lourenco Marques, Delagoa Bay and East Africa Railway in Mozambique places two 4-6-0 tank locomotives in service, one of which will become the Portuguese Tank on the Pretoria-Pietersburg Railway in 1897.

References

History of South Africa